The Cedar Street Bridge carries Illinois Route 8 and Illinois Route 116 over the Illinois River. The name of the bridge comes from the original name of its street on the Peoria side of the river; the street itself is now called MacArthur Highway, while the bridge is still referred to as Cedar Street.

Completed in 1933, it received the Award of Merit plaque of the American Institute of Steel Construction as the most beautiful bridge in class A (costing more than $1,000,000) for that year.

References

External links 
 John Weeks Bridge Page

Bridges completed in 1932
Bridges over the Illinois River
Buildings and structures in Peoria, Illinois
Bridges in Tazewell County, Illinois
East Peoria, Illinois
Truss arch bridges in the United States
Steel bridges in the United States
Road bridges in Illinois
Bridges in Peoria County, Illinois
1932 establishments in Illinois